The General Teaching Council for Wales was the body overseeing the qualification, registration, and good conduct of teachers in Wales.  It was replaced in 2015 by the Education Workforce Council.

References

Education in Wales
Education regulators
Professional associations based in Wales
Teaching in the United Kingdom